Par des Temps Incertains (In Uncertain Times) is volume eighteen in the French comic book (or bande dessinée) science fiction series Valérian and Laureline created by writer Pierre Christin and artist Jean-Claude Mézières.

Synopsis

Valérian is brooding over the loss of Galaxity and has immersed himself into the astroship's history tapes. Laureline breaks him from his reverie and elects to bring him exploring to take his mind off things.

On Hypsis, the Father is unhappy – the change to history triggered by the events of The Rage of Hypsis hasn't gone to plan. With no income and with the knowledge that Earth will disappear in the 27th century, he fears they will be taken over and driven into exile by one of the other towers on Hypsis. Now he has to intervene with a situation that has arisen on Earth.

Paris, 2001. The board of the multinational company Vivaxis are meeting to discuss their corporate rebranding. Suddenly, the Father of Hypsis manifests himself as a disembodied voice. He warns them against experimenting with human nature. The Spirit of Hypsis reads out the terms of a contract between God and Vivaxis.

In the industrial depths of Point Central, Sat, a member of a species exiled by Hypsis, meets with the twin-detectives Frankie and Harry. They inform him of Hypsis' intervention on Earth and suggest that he travels with them to deal with the situation personally.

Back on Earth, the Father's rage has got too much for him and the top of the Vivaxis building has collapsed. The board are forced to evacuate before the Spirit can complete reading the contract.

On Point Central, the Shingouz observe Sat leaving with the twin-detectives. The travel to the orbiting living satellite, Belorb where they communicate with Valérian and Laureline warning them that Hypsis have intervened in Paris and that another agent, Sat, a fallen archangel of Hypsis and the devil of human mythology, is also involved.

Valérian and Laureline travel to Earth and contact Mr Albert. He tells them of the mysterious explosion that has occurred in Vivaxis' tower in La Défence. He receives a message by carrier pigeon from a friend of his, Professor Petzold, who is director of worldwide research for Vivaxis. His message warns that Vivaxis is involved in research into human nature that would lead to eternal life through genetic manipulation and psychic conditioning. The research is being conducted at two centres – one in Romania and one in South Africa. Valérian and Laureline decide to split up in order to investigate each centre.

Sat arrives in Paris with Frankie and Harry. They take him to meet Master Mercury, an investment manager. Sat asks Mercury for his help in taking over Vivaxis.

Laureline reaches Romania and gains access to Vivaxis' secret laboratory where she is surprised find Schroeder (from The City of Shifting Waters). He has involved in mass-producing clones for Vivaxis though he doesn't know what they are to be used for. Laureline explains what has happened to Vivaxis and asks Schroeder to come with her.

Valérian finds the laboratory in South Africa but is captured, to his surprise, by Sun Rae (also from The City of the Moving Waters). Taken into the lab, he discovers that the clones from Romania are being brought here to be conditioned by three super-heroes: Irmgaal, Ortzog and Blumflum (from Heroes of the Equinox). Evading Sun Rae, he escapes with one of the finished clones.

Valérian and Laureline are reunited at the airport where they smuggle Schroeder and the clone that Valérian has stolen from South Africa past customs.

At the Palais des Congrès, Vivaxis are holding a press conference. Albert is in the audience with Professor Petzold. They observe that the Son and Holy Spirit of the Hypsis Trinity as well as Sat and the twin-detectives, Frankie and Harry, are also in attendance. Laureline arrives and joins Albert and Petzold. As the chairman of Vivaxis begins his speech, the wall behind him explodes and the Father of the Hypsis Trinity appears. As the attendees flee the auditorium, the Father and Sat square up to one another. Valérian interrupts bringing Schroeder and the first specimen of Vivaxis' research. The Father is not impressed with their work. Master Mercury reveals that Sat now holds the controlling stake in Vivaxis having taken advantage of the plunge in their share value. Albert presides over the drawing up of a new agreement between Hypsis and Vivaxis which will allow Sat to run Vivaxis while Hypsis will get a cut.

Valérian and Laureline take advantage of the situation to take a reward for themselves – information regarding the disappearance of Galaxity. Sat explains that Galaxity is in a super-massive black hole. The Father of Hypsis explains that the Dark Age following the cataclysm of 1986 still exists in a parallel universe. Valérian and Laureline, buoyed up by having a lead at last, head off on a new mission – to regain Galaxity.

As a tribute to the City of Moving Waters, Petzold and Shroeder are seen discussing their next business ventures which is space-time travel.

Main characters
 Valérian, from Galaxity, lost capital of Earth in the 28th century, formerly a Spatio-Temporal Agent, now working on a freelance basis.
 Laureline, from 11th century France, formerly a Spatio-Temporal Agent for Galaxity, now working on a freelance basis.
 Mr Albert, Valérian and Laureline's contact in early 21st century Earth.
 The Shingouz, a group of three aliens who trade in information.
 The Trinity of Hypsis – Father, Son and Holy Spirit, who may be the Holy Trinity found in Christian faith.
 Mr L.C.F. Sat, a fallen archangel of Hypsis who may be the Satan found in many Terran religious beliefs.
 Frankie and Harry, the twin-detectives.
 The chairman of Vivaxis, a multinational drug company.
 Cindy, personal assistant to the chairman of Vivaxis.
 Professor Petzold, director of worldwide research for Vivaxis.
 Master Mercury, an investment manager.
 Schroeder, research scientist at Vivaxis' Romanian laboratory.
 Sun Rae, director of security at Vivaxis' South African laboratory.

Settings

 Earth, the year 2001:
 France, Paris:
 La Défense, the headquarters of the multinational Vivaxis. Their tower is located next to the Grande Arche.
 Mr Albert's house in the suburbs, as seen previously in Métro Châtelet, Direction Cassiopeia.
 12th arrondissement. Frankie and Harry, accompanied by Sat, land their astroship in the Musée des Arts Forains - Collection Jean-Paul Favand at Pavillons de Bercy, Avenue des Terroirs de France. To get to their meeting with Master Mercury they board Line 14 of the Métro at Cour Saint-Emilion.
 Valérian and Laureline fly to and from Vivaxis' secret laboratories from Charles de Gaulle International Airport. Laureline uses the duty-free shop to update her wardrobe.
 Sat bases himself in a suite in the Hôtel Ritz Paris.
 The Trinity of Hypsis stay in a confession box in the Basilica of the Sacré Cœur in Montmartre.
 The Palais des Congrès de Paris, Place de la Porte Malliot, where Vivaxis hold their press conference.
 Romania, the Danube Delta. Vivaxis' secret laboratory, a facility once used by the Communist dictatorship, is located underwater, below the River Danube.
 South Africa, the Kalahari Desert. Vivaxis' secret laboratory, a facility once used by the apartheid regime to investigate racial differences, is located at the bottom of a former gold mine.
 Switzerland, Davos. Six months after the events of this album, Sat becomes guest of honour at the World Economic Forum.
 Earth, the year 1000:
 France. Sat visits Alberic the Old (the magician from Bad Dreams) to make use of his transformation spells to make his appearance more human and to get rid of the flies.
 The mysterious planet Hypsis, previously seen in The Rage of Hypsis.
 Point Central, the meeting place for all the races of the cosmos:
 The depths of Point Central where great foundries create antimatter from the remnants of dark planets, where repairs are conducted to nuclear plumbing and where poisonous fluids are recycled. This place may, literally, be the Hell found in certain religious beliefs found on Earth. The denizens of this segment like to relax in Hell's Igloo Bar where Glingue is served at absolute zero and compresses of pure snow are imported from the planet Boutiflonq.
 A seedy astroport where Frankie and Harry park their astroship under the watchful eye of the Shingouz.
 Belorb, a living creature in orbit around Point Central. She has the ability to communicate with anywhere in the cosmos, at a price.

Notes
 This album is prefaced by two quotations: "Free enterprise is another name for God" by the American political commentator Lewis H. Lapham and "Economics: the great Satan?" by the French economist Pierre-Noël Giraud.
 The digital images that appear on boards 1, 2 and 31 were created by Guillaume Invernel.
 This album uses an unprecedented number of characters and elements from earlier Valérian albums:
 Alberic the Old (Bad Dreams).
 Schroeder (The City of Shifting Waters)
 Sun Rae (The City of Shifting Waters and Brooklyn Station, Terminus Cosmos).
 Point Central (Ambassador of the Shadows, On the Frontiers and Hostages of the Ultralum)
 The Shingouz (Ambassador of the Shadows, The Ghosts of Inverloch, The Rage of Hypsis, On the Frontiers, The Circles of Power and Hostages of the Ultralum).
 The Grumpy Converter from Bluxte (Ambassador of the Shadows, The Circles of Power, Hostages of the Ultralum and Orphan of the Stars).
 Irmgaal, Ortzog and Blumflum (Heroes of the Equinox).
 Mr Albert (Métro Châtelet, Direction Cassiopeia, Brooklyn Station, Terminus Cosmos, On the Frontiers and The Living Weapons).
 The Trinity of Hypsis (The Rage of Hypsis).
 The cretiniser from Phoum (On the Frontiers and The Circles of Power).
 The twin-detectives Frankie and Harry (Hostages of the Ultralum).
 The portable temporal regulator (Orphan of the Stars).
 The image of God reaching out to destroy the Vivaxis clone in panel 1, board 49 is a deliberate spoof of the famous fresco The Creation of Adam by Michelangelo that can be found on the ceiling of the Sistine Chapel in Vatican City.

External links
Article on Dargaud's site about the making of board 44 of this album

2001 graphic novels
Valérian and Laureline